Evangelische Lutherische Dreienigkeit Kirche, also known as the Trinity Evangelical Lutheran Church Complex, is a historic church building in Grand Island, Nebraska. It was built in 1894-1896 by two German immigrants, Jacob and William Scheffel. Others on the building committee were E. Wiederaenders, F. Pribnow, J. Ruff, J. Schinkel and F. Eggers.. The congregation served pioneers from Germany. The building was designed in the Romanesque Revival architectural style. It has been listed on the National Register of Historic Places since December 1, 1986.

References

External links

National Register of Historic Places in Hall County, Nebraska
Romanesque Revival architecture in Nebraska
Buildings and structures completed in 1894
German-American culture in Nebraska